The Vibe is the first and only studio album by multi-national boy band Lexington Bridge. It was released on 23 November 2007 by Polydor Records. The band worked with a variety of musicians on the album, including Paul NZA, Marek Pompetzki, Remee, Jonas Saeed, Adel Tawil, and Thomas Troelsen. Released to minor commercial success, The Vibe debuted and peaked at number 86 on the German Albums Chart. Igt was preceded by the singles "Kick Back" and "Real Man," both of which reached the top 30 and top 20 of the German Singles Chart, respectively.

Singles
"Kick Back," co-written by Tony Momrelle was released as the album's first single. It peaked at number 24 on the German Singles Chart and reached number 62 in Austria. Second single "Real Man" featuring American rapper Snoop Dogg marked the band's only top 20 hit. It peaked at number 16 in Germany and reached number 66 on the Austrian Singles Chart. A third single, "Everything I Am", failed to chart.

Other songs
"Go On and Go" is a promo single off the album, released in select countries.
"I Just Can't Hate You" is not a single, but a music video of the song was released to promote the album.

Critical reception
German magazine Stern dismissed the album as "interchangeable pop."

Cover versions
A Chinese version of the song "Real Man" was recorded by Taiwanese pop singer Jolin Tsai for her 2009 album Butterfly.

Track listing

Charts

References

2007 debut albums
Lexington Bridge (band) albums
Polydor Records albums